The Sa'dabad Complex ( – Majmue ye Sa’dābād) is a 110 hectare complex built by the Qajar and Pahlavi monarchs, located in Shemiran, Greater Tehran, Iran. Today, the official residence of the President of Iran is located adjacent to the complex.

The complex includes more than 180 hectares of natural forest, streets, qanats, galleries, mansions/palaces and museums.

History
The complex was initially built and inhabited by Qajar dynasty of monarchs in the 19th century. After extensive expansions, Reza Shah of the Pahlavi Dynasty resided there in the 1920s. His son, Shah Mohammad Reza Pahlavi, moved there in the 1970s. In 1978, President Jimmy Carter stayed in the palace during a visit to Pahlavi Iran to guarantee U.S. support for the regime. After the 1979 Revolution, the complex became a public museum.

Present use
Large parts of the complex are museums, which are accessible to visitors. Other parts are currently used by the Office of the President of the Islamic Republic of Iran. The complex is operated by the Cultural Heritage Organization of Iran which is responsible for most of the artifacts, locations, and cultural aspects of the country.

Sites

Gates to the complex
 Nezamie Gate, from which Reza Shah would enter the complex.
 Zaferanie Gate, Currently used by  the presidency organization.
 Gate of Darband Street, from which the Shah Mohammad Reza Pahlavi would enter the complex.
 Gate of Darband Square
 Ja'far Abad Gate (1st)
 Ja'far Abad Gate (2nd)
 River Gate
 The White House Gate

Main buildings

 Ahmad Shah Qajar Palace

 The Green Palace

 The Mellat Museum

The White Palace, former official residence of Shah Mohammad Reza Pahlavi and Empress Farah Diba.
 Museum of Natural History

The Special Palace, currently used by the presidency organization.
 Museum of Fine Arts

The Black Palace
 Museum of Anthropology

Princess Shams Palace, named after Shams Pahlavi.
 Museum of Glassware and Handicrafts

Princess Ashraf Palace, named after the sister of Mohammad Reza Pahlavi.
 Building of the Amendment 36 (a governmental agency)

Prince Gholam Reza palace, named after Gholam Reza Pahlavi.
 Palace of the King Mother
Currently used by the presidency organization.
 Prince Ahmad Reza Palace, named after 2nd son of Reza Shah
Currently used by the presidency organization.
 Administration of the complex

Prince Abdol Reza Palace, named after Abdul Reza Pahlavi, the son of Reza Shah.
 The Training Center

Prince Bahman Palace, named after the son of Gholam Reza Pahlavi.
 The Military Museum

Prince Shahram Palace, named after the son of Ashraf Pahlavi.
 Museum of Artistic Creatures

Palace of Farideh Ghotbi, mother of Empress Farah Diba.
 The Behzad Museum

1st Palace of Reza Pahlavi, named after Reza Pahlavi II.
 Museum of Treasure (The Dafine Museum)

2nd Palace of Reza Pahlavi, currently used by the presidency organization.
 Museum of Mir Emad Calligraphy

Palace of Princess Farahnaz and Prince Ali Reza, named after Farahnaz and Ali Reza, children of Mohammad Reza Pahlavi.
 The Abkar Museum

Princess Leila Palace, named after Leila Pahlavi.

Palace of the King's mother 
During the Pahlavi period, this palace was the place of the last years of Reza Shah's life before his exile to Mauritius. It was also the place of residence of the king's mother (Taj al-Muluk) until the time of the 1979 Revolution. 

This palace is currently in the possession of the Presidential Institution of Iran and is reserved for special guests of the Government of Iran; and for this reason it is also famous as "The Republic Building". This palace is also currently inaccessible to the public.

The green palace 
The Green Museum Palace has been called "the most beautiful palace in Iran". This palace is important due to its historical and architectural importance. It dates back to the Qajar period and has two styles of Iranian architecture. They called this palace "The Stone Palace" during the reign of Reza Khan and "The Shahvand palace" during the reign of Mohammad Reza Pahlavi; later, ii was called "The Green Palace" because of its green façade.

The Mellat Museum 
The Palace of the Nation Museum with an area of 7,000 square meters is the largest palace in Sa'dabad complex; and was also famous as "The White House" due to its white facade. Other names of this palace during different years were: The King's Palace, The Private Palace and The Private White House. 

Until after the 1979 revolution and the transfer of the complex to the Cultural Heritage Organization, it was renamed "The Palace of the Nation Museum" (Mellat museum in Persian). The construction of the Palace, began in the late Pahlavi period.

Gallery

See also

Niavaran Complex
Treaty of Saadabad
Pahlavi Iran
Pahlavi dynasty
Iranian architecture
Presidential palace

References

External links

Official website
Irprsiatour Website

Buildings of the Qajar period
Architecture in Iran
Palaces in Tehran
Royal residences in Iran
Tourist attractions in Tehran
Museums in Tehran
National museums of Iran
Houses completed in the 19th century
Persian gardens in Iran
Historic house museums in Iran
Palaces in Iran